Hrvoje Vejić (born 8 June 1977) is a Croatian retired footballer who is the president of NK Jadran Luka Ploče. He plays at the center-back position.

Club career
In 1998 Vejić started his football career in the Croatian capital with NK Zagreb, where he played for three seasons. He then spent four seasons at Hajduk Split, where he became the team captain, before moving to Tom Tomsk of Russia.

Vejić joined his former club Hajduk Split on 12 January 2009 as a free player after leaving Tomsk.

International career
He played four matches for his country's under-21 side between 1998 and 1999 in the qualifying matches for the 2000 UEFA European Under-21 Football Championship. He made his first appearance for the senior team against Norway in a friendly match on 7 February 2007. Despite not playing a single minute in Croatia's Euro 2008 qualification campaign he was chosen to participate in the final tournament, where he received one cap playing full 90 minutes in a 1–0 victory over Poland, as he and Knežević replaced regular starters Kovač and Šimunić, who were being rested.

Vejić earned a total of 5 caps, scoring no goals, and his final international was an April 2009 World Cup qualification match away against Andorra.

References

External links
 

1977 births
Living people
Sportspeople from Metković
Association football central defenders
Croatian footballers
Croatia under-21 international footballers
Croatia international footballers
UEFA Euro 2008 players
NK Zagreb players
HNK Hajduk Split players
FC Tom Tomsk players
NK Primorac 1929 players
NK Zadar players
Croatian Football League players
Russian Premier League players
Second Football League (Croatia) players
Croatian expatriate footballers
Expatriate footballers in Russia
Croatian expatriate sportspeople in Russia